Grażyna  is a  Polish feminine given name. The name was created by the Polish poet Adam Mickiewicz for the main character of his 1823 poem Grażyna. The name is derived from the Lithuanian adjective gražus, meaning "pretty", "beautiful".

Diminutives/hypocoristics include Grasia, Grazia, Grażynka, Grażka, Grażusia.

In Polish tradition, the name days for Grażyna are April 1 and July 26.

Notable people 
 Grażyna Auguścik (born 1955), Polish jazz vocalist, composer, and arranger
 Grażyna Bacewicz (1909–1969), Polish composer and violinist
 Grażyna Błęcka-Kolska (born 1962), Polish actress
 Grażyna Brodzińska (born 1951), Polish soprano, opera and operetta singer, and musical actress
 Grażyna Ciemniak (born 1948), Polish politician 
 Grażyna Długołęcka (born 1951), Polish film actress
 Grażyna Gęsicka (1951–2010), Polish sociologist and politician 
 Grazyna Kochanska, Polish-American developmental psychologist
 Grażyna Kostrzewińska (born 1950), Polish pair skater
 Grażyna Kulczyk (born 1950), Polish investor, art collector, philanthropist and billionaire
 Grazyna Monvid, British actress, author and award-winning playwright
 Grażyna Miller (1957–2009), Polish poet and translator
 Grażyna Prokopek (born 1977), Polish sprinter
 Grażyna Pstrokońska-Nawratil (born 1947), Polish composer and music educator
 Grażyna Szapołowska (born 1953), Polish film and theatre actress
 Grażyna Staszak-Makowska (born 1953), Polish fencer
 Grażyna Strachota (born 1960), Polish actress
 Grażyna Rabsztyn (born 1952), Polish hurdler
 Grażyna Witkowska (born 1952), Polish gymnast
 Grażyna Wolszczak (born 1958), Polish actress
 Grażyna Vetulani (born 1956), Polish philologist and linguist, professor of the humanities
 Wanda Grażyna Gałecka-Szmurło (1899-1993), Polish lawyer, independence and social activist, the second woman in Poland who was entered on the list of lawyers

See also
Gražina

References

Polish feminine given names
Feminine given names
Words originating in fiction